A ginger group is a formal or informal group within an organisation seeking to influence its direction and activity. The term comes from the phrase ginger up, meaning to enliven or stimulate. Ginger groups work to alter the organisation's policies, practices, or office-holders, while still supporting its general goals. Ginger groups sometimes form within the political parties of Commonwealth countries such as the United Kingdom, Canada, Australia, New Zealand, India, and Pakistan.

The Monday Night Cabal 

The Monday Night Cabal was a 'ginger group' of influential people set up in London by Leo Amery at the start of 1916 to discuss war policy. The nucleus of the group consisted of Lord Milner, George Carson, Geoffrey Dawson, Waldorf Astor and F. S. Oliver. The group got together for Monday night dinners and to discuss politics. Throughout 1916, their numbers and influence grew to include Minister of Munitions David Lloyd George, General Henry Wilson, Philip Kerr, and Mark Jameson. It was through the Ginger Group that Times editor Geoffrey Dawson published a December 4, 1916 news story titled "Reconstruction" that set in motion events that caused Prime Minister H. H. Asquith to resign, signalling the rise of the Lloyd George Ministry.

Other examples 

 Ginger Group, a radical group of left-wing Canadian MPs in the 1920s and early 1930s
 Ginger Group (Queensland)
 Kitchen Cabinet, a term used by political opponents of President of the United States Andrew Jackson to describe his ginger group
 League of Empire Loyalists, a 1950s UK ginger group
 Momentum, which has been described as a ginger group within the British Labour Party

See also 

Entryism, a more militant tactic not always supporting general goals
Pressure group, an outside, as opposed to inside, group formed to influence the direction and activity of an organisation

Footnotes

References 
 Amery, Leo, My Political Life, Vol. II, War and Peace (1914-1929), London: Hutchinson, 1953
 Gollin, Alfred, Proconsul in Politics, London: Blond, 1964
 Marlowe, John, Milner: Apostle of Empire, London: Hamish Hamilton, 1976
 Stewart, A.T.Q., Edward Carson, Belfast: Blackstaff, 1981

External Links 
 Internet Archive, Link (Please sign up to view original source material for Footnotes and References)

Political terminology